The Indian state of Tamil Nadu has 38 districts after several splits of the original 13 districts at the formation of the state on 1 November 1956. The districts are further divided into taluks and smaller administrative units.

History

Pre-independence 

At the time of Independence, Madras Presidency in India was made up of 26 districts, of which 12 districts were found in the present-day Tamil Nadu, namely, Chingleput, Coimbatore, Nilgiris, North Arcot, Madras, Madura, Ramnad, Salem, South Arcot, Tanjore, Tinnevely, and Trichinopoly.

1947–1956 
After Indian Independence, the Madras Presidency under British rule became the Madras Province on 15 August 1947. After Indian independence in 1947, the Pudukkottai Princely State was amalgamated with Indian Union on 4 March 1948 and became a division in Trichinopoly district. The new Constitution of India, which came into force on 26 January 1950, made India a sovereign democratic republic. According to this act, on 26 January 1950, Madras Province was formed as Madras State by the Government of India. 

At the time of formation of Madras State in 1950, it included the whole of present-day Tamil Nadu, Coastal Andhra, Rayalaseema, the Malabar region of North Kerala, Bellary and South Canara. Coastal Andhra and Rayalaseema were separated to form Andhra State in 1953, while South Canara and Bellary districts were merged with Mysore State to form Karnataka state, and Malabar District with the State of Travancore-Cochin to form Kerala in 1956.

1956 

As a result of the 1956 States Reorganisation Act, the state's boundaries were re-organized following linguistic lines. The Tamil speaking region of Kanyakumari was merged to Madras state which was earlier a part of Travancore-Cochin. Madras state was formed on 1 November 1956, with 13 southern districts of Madras Presidency.

They are as follow : Chingleput, Coimbatore, Kanyakumari, Madras, Madurai, Nilgiris, North Arcot, Ramanathapuram, Salem, South Arcot, Thanjavur, Tiruchirappalli and Tirunelveli.

1960–1989 

 On 2 October 1966, Dharmapuri district was bifurcated from the erstwhile Salem district comprising Dharmapuri, Harur, Hosur and Krishnagiri taluks.
 In 1969, Madras State was renamed as Tamil Nadu.
 On 14 January 1974, Pudukkottai district was formed from the parts of Tiruchirappalli and Thanjavur districts comprising Kulathur, Thirumayam, Alangudi and Aranthangi taluks.
 On 31 August 1979, Erode district was bifurcated from the erstwhile Coimbatore district comprising Bhavani, Erode and Sathyamangalam taluks.
 On 8 March 1985, Sivaganga and Virudhunagar districts were trifurcated from the erstwhile Ramanathapuram district with Sivaganga district comprising Tirupattur, Karaikudi, Devakottai, Sivaganga, Manamadurai and Ilaiyangudi taluks and Virudhunagar district comprising Srivilliputhur, Virudhunagar, Tiruchuli, Aruppukottai, Sattur and Rajapalayam taluks.
 On 15 September 1985, Dindigul district was bifurcated from the erstwhile Madurai district comprising Dindigul, Palani and Kodaikanal taluks.
 On 20 October 1986, Thoothukudi district was bifurcated from the erstwhile Tirunelveli district comprising Thoothukudi, Ottapidaram and Tiruvaikuntam taluks.
 On 30 September 1989, Tiruvannamalai and Vellore districts were bifurcated from the erstwhile North Arcot district (District ceased to exist) with Tiruvannamalai district comprising Tiruvannamalai, Arni, Vandavasi, Cheyyar, Polur and Chengam taluks and Vellore district comprising Arakkonam, Arcot, Gudiyatham, Tirupattur, Vellore, Vaniyambadi and Walaja taluks.

1990–1999 
 On 18 October 1991, Nagapattinam was bifurcated from the erstwhile Thanjavur district comprising Tiruvarur, Mayiladuthurai, Manargudi, Nagapattinam divisions and Valangaiman taluk from Kumabakonam division.
 On 30 September 1993, Cuddalore and Viluppuram districts were bifurcated from the erstwhile South Arcot district (District ceased to exist) with Cuddalore district comprising Cuddalore, Chidambaram and Vriddhachalam taluks and Villupuram district comprising Kallakuruchi, Villupuram, Tirukkoyilur and Tindivanam.
 On 30 September 1995, Karur and Perambalur districts were trifurcated from the erstwhile Tiruchirappalli district  with Karur district comprising Karur, Kulithalai and Manapparai taluks and Perambalur district comprising Perambalur and Kunnam taluks.
 On 25 July 1996, Theni district was bifurcated from the erstwhile from Madurai district comprising Theni, Bodinayakanur, Periyakulam, Uthamapalayam and Andipatti taluks.
 On 1 January 1997 Tiruvarur was formed from the parts of erstwhile Nagapattinam and Thanjavur districts comprising Tiruvarur, Nannilam, Kudavasal, Needamangalam, Mannargudi, Thiruthuraipoondi taluks from Nagappatinam district and Valangaiman taluk from Thanjavur district.
 On 1 January 1997, Namakkal district was bifurcated from the erstwhile Salem district comprising Namakkal, Tiruchengode, Rasipuram and Paramathi-Velur taluks.
 On 1 July 1997, Kanchipuram and Tiruvallur districts were bifurcated from the erstwhile Chengalpattu district (District ceased to exist) with Kanchipuram district comprising Kanchipuram, Sriperumbudur, Uthiramerur, Chengalpattu, Tambaram, Tirukalukundram, Maduranthakam and Cheyyur taluks and Tiruvallur district comprising Tiruvallur, Tiruttani taluks and Uthukkottai and Pallipattu sub-taluks separated from Chengalpattu District along with Ponneri and Gummidipoondi taluks of Saidapet revenue division.

2000–Present 
 On 9 February 2004, Krishnagiri district was bifurcated from the erstwhile Dharmapuri district comprising Krishnagiri, Hosur, Pochampalli, Uthangarai and Denkanikottai taluks.
 On 19 November 2007, Ariyalur district was bifurcated from the erstwhile Perambalur district  comprising Ariyalur, Udayarpalayam and Sendurai taluks.
 On 24 October 2009, Tiruppur district was formed from the parts of Coimbatore and Erode districts with Tiruppur, Udumalpet, Palladam and parts of Avinashi taluks of Coimbatore districts and Dharapuram, Kangeyam and parts of Perundurai taluks of Erode district.
 On 5 January 2018, Chennai district altered its borders with increase in area by the annexation of Madhavaram, Maduravoyal, Ambattur, Tiruvottriyur taluks and parts of Ponneri taluk of Tiruvallur  and Alandur and Sholinganallur taluks of Kanchipuram (present day Chengalpattu) districts. 
 On 22 November 2019, Tenkasi district was bifurcated from the erstwhile Tirunelveli district comprising Tenkasi, Sengottai, Kadayanallur, Sivagiri, Veerakeralampudur, Sankarankovil, Thiruvenkatam and Alangulam taluks. 
 On 26 November 2019, Kallakurichi district was bifurcated from the erstwhile Viluppuram district comprising Kallakurichi, Sankarapuram, Chinnasalem, Ulundurpet, Thirukovilur and Kalvarayanmalai taluks. 
 On 29 November 2019, Tirupattur and Ranipet districts were trifurcated from the erstwhile Vellore district with Tirupattur district comprising Tirupattur, Vaniyambadi, Natrampalli and Ambur taluks and Ranipet district comprising Walajah, Arcot, Nemili and Arakkonam taluks.
 On 30 November 2019, Chengalpattu district was bifurcated from the erstwhile Kanchipuram district comprising Tirukalukundram, Chengalpattu, Madurantakam, Cheyyar, Tiruporur, Tambaram, Pallavaram, and Vandalur taluks.
 On 24 March 2020, Mayiladuthurai district was bifurcated from the erstwhile Nagapattinam district comprising Mayiladuthurai, Sirkazhi, Tharangambadi and Kuthalam taluks.

List

Former districts

See also
 List of developmental administrative units of Tamil Nadu 
 List of revenue divisions of Tamil Nadu
List of districts in Tamil Nadu by Human Development Index
List of constituencies of the Tamil Nadu Legislative Assembly
List of constituencies of the Lok Sabha in Tamil Nadu

References 

Tamil Nadu
Districts
 
Taluks of Tamil Nadu